Ian Paia (born 28 October 1990) is a Solomon Islands footballer who currently plays for Solomon Warriors in the Telekom S-League as a forward.

Club career
Paia has been a youth product of Koloale FC Honiara. After a few years he signed for the Solomon Warriors in 2014. After playing in the OFC Champions League he signed in 2017 for Vanuatuan side Ifira Black Bird. After winning the Vanuatuan Championship he returned to the Solomon Warriors.

International career 
Paia played his first international game with the senior national team on 9 July 2011 against Vanuatu (0–0).

Honours 
Koloale
Solomon Islands National Club Championship/Telekom S-League (1): 2010–11

References

External links 
 
 
 

1990 births
Living people
Solomon Islands footballers
Solomon Islands international footballers
Association football forwards
Solomon Warriors F.C. players